Lowanna is a village (pop 335) in the Coffs Harbour hinterland, officially a suburb of the City of Coffs Harbour. It has a Community Hall, Primary School, Tennis Court and General Store. The name Lowanna is an Aboriginal language word meaning "girl". Lowanna had a train station on the now-closed Dorrigo railway line.

References 

Mid North Coast
Northern Rivers
Towns in New South Wales